This is a list of the National Register of Historic Places listings in Gloucester, Massachusetts.

This is intended to be a complete list of the properties and districts on the National Register of Historic Places in Gloucester, Massachusetts, United States. The locations of National Register properties and districts for which the latitude and longitude coordinates are included below, may be seen in an online map.

Essex County, of which Gloucester is a part, is the location of more than 450 properties and districts listed on the National Register. Gloucester itself is the location of 34 of these properties and districts.

Current listings

|}

See also

List of National Historic Landmarks in Massachusetts
National Register of Historic Places listings in Massachusetts
National Register of Historic Places listings in Essex County, Massachusetts

References

Gloucester, Massachusetts
Gloucester
 Gloucester
Gloucester, Massachusetts